His Brother's Keeper may refer to:

 His Brother's Keeper (1921 film), an American silent film directed by Wilfrid North
 His Brother's Keeper (1940 film), a British film written by Brock Williams
 His Brother's Keeper, a 1993 novel by Peter Rawlinson, Baron Rawlinson of Ewell
 His Brother's Keeper: A Story from the Edge of Medicine, a 2004 book by Jonathan Weiner
 His Brother's Keeper: The Life and Murder of Tennessee Williams, a 1983 biography by Dakin Williams, brother of Tennessee Williams

See also
 Brother's keeper (disambiguation)
 My Brother's Keeper (disambiguation)
 Her Brother's Keeper (disambiguation)